Elbridge Township is one of fifteen townships in Edgar County, Illinois, USA. At the 2010 census, its population was 830 and it contained 343 housing units.

Geography

Cities, towns, villages
 Vermilion (south quarter)

Extinct towns
 Elbridge
 Ferrel
 Marley
 Nevins
 West Sandford

Cemeteries
The township contains these eight cemeteries: Cummings, Gymon, New Providence, Old Baptist, Simms, Vermilion, Wilkins and Wilson.

School districts
 Paris Community Unit School District 4

Political districts
 Illinois's 15th congressional district
 State House District 109
 State Senate District 55

References
 
 United States Census Bureau 2007 TIGER/Line Shapefiles
 United States National Atlas

External links
 City-Data.com
 Illinois State Archives
 Edgar County Official web site

Townships in Edgar County, Illinois
Townships in Illinois